New Hampshire increased from 3 seats to 4 seats after the 1790 census.

See also 
 United States House of Representatives elections, 1792 and 1793
 List of United States representatives from New Hampshire

References 

New Hampshire
1792
United States House of Representatives